John Andrew McGuire (February 28, 1906 – May 28, 1976) was a U.S. Representative from Connecticut.

Born in Wallingford, Connecticut, McGuire attended the public schools. He was a student at Lyman Hall High School, Wallingford, in 1924, and graduated from Dartmouth College in 1928. He was employed as a bank clerk from 1928 to 1934.

He was town clerk of Wallingford from January 1, 1934, to December 31, 1949. He served as Democratic State Chairman in 1946. He engaged in general insurance business in Wallingford in 1935. He served as delegate to the Democratic state conventions from 1936 to 1956, and to the Democratic National Convention in 1950.

Mcguire was elected as a Democrat to the Eighty-first and to the Eighty-second Congresses (January 3, 1949 – January 3, 1953). He was an unsuccessful candidate for reelection in 1952 to the Eighty-third Congress.

He resumed his activity in the insurance, real estate, and travel business. He served as a member of Connecticut State Legislature from 1961 to 1962. He was appointed deputy sheriff of New Haven County on November 10, 1969. He was the executive director of the Wallingford Housing Authority at the time of his death. He died in Wallingford, Connecticut, May 28, 1976, and was interred in St. John's Cemetery.

References

1906 births
1976 deaths
People from Wallingford, Connecticut
Dartmouth College alumni
Democratic Party members of the United States House of Representatives from Connecticut
Democratic Party members of the Connecticut House of Representatives
20th-century American politicians